The 1995 East Northamptonshire District Council election took place on 2 May 1995 to elect members of East Northamptonshire District Council in Northamptonshire, England. This was on the same day as other local elections. This was the first election to be held under new ward boundaries. The Labour Party gained overall control of the council for the first and only time in the council's history.

Ward-by-Ward Results

Barnwell Ward (1 seat)

Brigstock Ward (1 seat)

Drayton Ward (1 seat)

Forest Ward (1 seat)

Higham Ferriers Ward (3 seats)

Irthlingborough Ward (3 seats)

Kings Cliffe Ward (1 seat)

Lower Nene Ward (1 seat)

Margaret Beaufort Ward (1 seat)

Oundle Ward (2 seats)

Raunds Ward (3 seats)

Ringstead Ward (1 seat)

Rushden East Ward (3 seats)

Rushden North Ward (3 seats)

Rushden South Ward (3 seats)

Rushden West Ward (3 seats)

Stanwick Ward (1 seat)

Thrapston Ward (2 seats)

Willibrook Ward (1 seat)

Woodford Ward (1 seat)

References

1995 English local elections
1995
1990s in Northamptonshire